Sir Arthur Robert Guinness (11 January 1846 – 10 June 1913) was a New Zealand politician, and Speaker of the House of Representatives.

Personal information
He was born in Calcutta, India, son of Frank Guinness, who arrived at Lyttelton by the ship Tory in August 1852. He was educated at Christ's College, Christchurch 1854–1859 (being no. 31 on the list). He received his legal education from Edward Harston and then from Garrick and Cowlishaw, before being admitted to the bar in 1867. He then practised as a barrister and solicitor in Greymouth, where he served on the Westland Provincial Council from 1874 to 1876, and was then a member of the Grey County Council from 1876 to 1890, including nine as its chair.

Member of Parliament

Guinness first stood for two-member Grey Valley in the 1876 election and out of the four candidates, he came last. He remained a member of the House of Representatives for Greymouth until 1890, and then represented the Grey electorate until his death in 1913. He belonged to the Liberal Party.

He was Chairman of Committees from 1893 to 1902, then the 7th Speaker of the House of Representatives from 1903 until his death in 1913. Upon the death of William Steward on 30 October 1912, he became Father of the House. When he died, his replacement from the Grey by-election was Paddy Webb, who was elected on the second ballot with Liberal support.

Family

In 1875, Guinness married Elisabeth Westbrook, daughter of Mr James Westbrook of Launceston. He was knighted in 1911. Guinness died on 10 June 1913 and is buried at Greymouth Cemetery.

He was a great-grandson of his namesake the Dublin brewer Arthur Guinness (1725–1803).

Notes

References

|-

|-

|-

1846 births
1913 deaths
Members of the Westland Provincial Council
New Zealand Knights Bachelor
19th-century New Zealand lawyers
New Zealand Liberal Party MPs
Speakers of the New Zealand House of Representatives
Members of the New Zealand House of Representatives
People educated at Christ's College, Christchurch
People from Christchurch
New Zealand MPs for South Island electorates
Mayors of Grey
19th-century New Zealand politicians
New Zealand politicians awarded knighthoods
Arthur